Aiyo, Not Bad is the thirteenth studio album by Taiwanese singer Jay Chou, released on 26 December 2014 by JVR Music.

The album was nominated for three Golden Melody Awards.

Track listing

Awards

Chart

References

External links
  Jay Chou discography@JVR Music

2014 albums
Jay Chou albums
Sony Music Taiwan albums